Blonde Dynamite is a 1950 American comedy film directed by William Beaudine and starring The Bowery Boys. The film was released on February 12, 1950 by Monogram Pictures and is the seventeenth film in the series.

Plot
After Slip and Sach are thrown out on the street after unsuccessfully trying to get jobs as urbane male escorts, the enraged Slip vows to start his own escort agency.
 
Slip suggests that the hard working Louie take a vacation and hand over the responsibilities of the sweet shop to the boys.  Louie reluctantly agrees and takes his wife to Coney Island.  The boys turn his sweet shop into their escort service and give the place a makeover.

Meanwhile, Gabe, who works as a messenger for a bank, has gotten himself into trouble.  He had $5,000 of the bank's money stolen from him by a scheming woman working with local gangsters who threaten to frame him for the theft unless he agrees to get the bank vault combination for them.  He gives them the combination and the gangsters take over the sweet shop from Sach, who is minding it while Slip and the rest of the boys are out serving as escorts.  Their goal is to dig from the sweet shop to the bank, and Sach allows them to after they convince him that they are government men looking for uranium.  Eventually Slip, Louie, and the rest of the boys wind up back at the sweet shop and are pressed into service.

Gabe goes to the police to tell the whole story, and as soon as he does, the gangsters dig through the police station floor (which is situated behind the bank) and are captured.  Louie is temporarily pleased as Sach did find uranium under his store, but in the end it is discovered that he only owns the land...not the mineral rights!  He faints and a doctor tells him all he needs is a vacation to feel better!

Cast

The Bowery Boys
Leo Gorcey as Terrance Aloysius 'Slip' Mahoney
Huntz Hall as Horace Debussy 'Sach' Jones
William Benedict as Whitmore 'Whitey'
David Gorcey as Cedric 'Chuck'
Buddy Gorman as Bartholemew 'Butch'

Remaining cast
Gabriel Dell as Gabe Moreno
Bernard Gorcey as Louie Dumbrowski
Adele Jergens as Joan Marshall
Harry Lewis as Champ
Stanley Andrews as Mr. Jennings
Jody Gilbert as Sarah Dumbrowski

Production
Beginning with Blonde Dynamite, Buddy Gorman temporarily takes over for the role of 'Butch' in the absence of Bennie Bartlett.

Home media
Warner Archives released the film on made-to-order DVD in the United States as part of "The Bowery Boys, Volume One" on November 23, 2012.

References

External links

1950 films
Bowery Boys films
American black-and-white films
1950s English-language films
1950 comedy films
Monogram Pictures films
Films directed by William Beaudine
American comedy films
1950s American films